Pico is a town and comune in the province of Frosinone, in the Lazio region of central Italy.  It is bounded by other comunes of San Giovanni Incarico, Campodimele, Pontecorvo, Pastena and Lenola.

It is part of the Comunità Montana Monti Ausoni. Sights include the Farnese castle, founded around the 11th century AD.

References

Municipalities of the Province of Frosinone